Kevin Camilo Rendón Guerrero (born 8 January 1993) is a Colombian professional footballer player who plays for Valour FC in the Canadian Premier League.

Early life
Rendón is the son of former Colombian footballer Carlos Rendón. He began playing youth football with Deportivo Pasto. In 2011, he served as captain of Deportivo Pasto's U20 side, finishing as the team's leading scorer.

Club career
He made his debut for the Deportivo Pasto first team in a Copa Colombia match in 2010. He made his league debut in the Categoría Primera B on 28 February 2010, scoring against Atlético de la Sabana. He helped them win the Primera B title in 2011, earning promotion to the first tier Categoría Primera A. In January 2013, he joined Argentinian club Estudiantes de La Plata on a one-year loan. In May 2013, after not making any appearances with Estudiantes (only appearing a few reserve team matches, he terminated his loan early and returned to Deportivo Pasto. In November 2014, he terminated his contract with Pasto over unpaid wages.

For the 2015 season, he joined Millonarios. He left the club in December after the expiry of his contract.

In January 2016, he joined Patriotas Boyacá.

In July 2018, he joined Leones. He departed the club in December 2021, after they were relegated to the Categoría Primera B.

In January 2019, he returned to his former club Deportivo Pasto. In December 2021, he left the club.

On 31 May 2022, he joined Canadian Premier League club Valour FC. He made his debut on 10 July against HFX Wanderers FC.

International career
He received callups to training camps for the Colombia U20 in 2012 and 2013.

References

External links

1993 births
Living people
Association football forwards
Deportivo Pasto footballers
Estudiantes de La Plata footballers
Millonarios F.C. players
Patriotas Boyacá footballers
Leones F.C. footballers
Valour FC players
Canadian Premier League players
Categoría Primera A players
Categoría Primera B players
Colombian footballers